White Bay may refer to a number of geographic locations:

 White Bay (New South Wales), Sydney, Australia
 White Bay (Newfoundland), Canada
 White Bay, British Virgin Islands
 Bahía Blanca (White Bay) in the south east of the province of Buenos Aires, Argentina
 White Bay, Umm Al Quwain - United Arab Emirates